Red Pepper is a daily tabloid newspaper in Uganda that began publication on 19 June 2001. Mirroring tabloid styles in other countries, the paper is known for its mix of sensationalism, scandal, and frequent nudity. The paper has received the ire of the Ugandan government for publishing conspiracy theories relating to the death of Sudan's Vice President John Garang in a helicopter crash and revealing that former foreign minister James Wapakhabulo died of AIDS.

In August 2006, Red Pepper published the first names and occupations of prominent Ugandan men whom it asserted were gay. This decision was sharply criticized by Human Rights Watch, which said that the publishing could have exposed the men to government harassment because homosexuality in Uganda remained illegal. The following month, Red Pepper published a similar list of 13 women whom it claimed were lesbians.

In an interview published in May 2009, the news editor of Red Pepper, Ben Byarabaha, vowed that the tabloid would continue its campaign against alleged homosexuals by publishing their names, photographs, and addresses.

In September 2012, the newspaper was sued about its published nude photo of an herbalist. In January 2018, Red Pepper was reopened by the government

Available Newspapers 

 The Red Pepper Newspaper
 The Saturday Pepper
 The Sunday Pepper
 Kamunye News Paper
 Entasi Weekly News Paper

2013 police raid
Uganda Police raided the premises of Red Pepper on 20 May 2013. This happened soon after the paper had published a letter allegedly written by Army General David Sejusa, threatening that those opposing Muhoozi Kainerugaba for presidency risked their lives. Kainerugaba is the son of the long-standing President Yoweri Museveni. The same letter was also published by another Ugandan newspaper, the Daily Monitor, whose offices were also raided. Both daily newspapers remained closed for ten consecutive days, until the siege was lifted on 30 May 2013.

2021 Rebranding & Office Relocation 
Around mid-2021, the company rebranded From Red Pepper to Daily Pepper still a tabloid News letter.

Around Late 2021, the company relocated from its main offices from Namanve_along Jinja Road to Bweyogerere-Buto just opposite UNBS.

See also
 LGBT rights in Uganda
 Rolling Stone (Uganda)

References

External links
 
 https://www.redpepper.co.ug/

Daily newspapers published in Uganda
Publications established in 2001
2001 establishments in Uganda
English-language newspapers published in Africa